After the Rain Comes Sunshine is a 1949 West German comedy film directed by Erich Kobler and starring Sonja Ziemann, Gert Fröbe and Rudolf Platte. It takes its title from a popular song of the postwar era.

The film's sets were designed by the art director Theo Zwierski.

Cast
 Sonja Ziemann as Sabine
 Gert Fröbe as Konstantin
 Rudolf Platte as Onkel Eduard
 Ralph Lothar as Beni
 Willy Reichert as Der Bürgermeister
 Liesl Karlstadt as Die Bürgermeisterin
 Beppo Brem as Polizist Schneider
 Willi Rose as Hauptwachtmeister
 Gunnar Möller as Polizist Otto
 Gisela von Jagen as Agathe
 Renate Mannhardt as Renate
 Heini Göbel as Der Bandit
 Ellinor von Hartlieb as Babett
 Paula Braend as Paula Buchenau

References

Bibliography
 Gerald Grote. Der Kommissar: eine Serie und ihre Folgen. Schwarzkopf & Schwarzkopf, 2003.

External links 
 

1949 films
1949 comedy films
German comedy films
West German films
1940s German-language films
Films directed by Erich Kobler
German black-and-white films
1940s German films